North Lancashire/Cumbria (usually referred to as North Lancs/Cumbria) was an English Rugby Union League at the seventh tier of club rugby union for teams from North Lancashire and Cumbria that ran until the end of 2017–18 season. Promotion from this division used to be into North 1 West with the champions going straight up and the league runners up facing the league runners up from South Lancs/Cheshire 1 for their place.  Clubs at the bottom of the table were relegated either to North Lancashire 1, South Lancs/Cheshire 2 or the Cumbria League depending on their geographical location.

The division was initially known as North-West East/North 1 when it was created in 1987, and had a number of different names since with North Lancs/Cumbria being the longest running.  At the end of the 2017–18 season, the RFU had to cancel the division after 19 Lancashire clubs withdrew from RFU competitions across the leagues to form their own competitions.  As a result, all Lancashire based teams in this division that wanted to remain in the RFU league structure were transferred into Lancs/Cheshire 1, while the Cumbria sides were transferred into Cumbria 1.

Teams 2017–18

Participating Clubs 2016-17
Aldwinians
Aspatria
Bolton
Carlisle (relegated from North 1 West)
De La Salle (Salford)
Fleetwood
Hawcourt Park
Littleborough (promoted from Lancashire (North))
Oldham
Silloth
Trafford MV (promoted from Lancashire (North))
Upper Eden
Wigton
Workington (promoted from Cumbria League)

Participating Clubs 2015-16

Participating Clubs 2014-15
Aldwinians
Aspatria
Blackburn
De La Salle (Salford) (promoted from North Lancashire 1)
Fleetwood	
Furness (promoted from Cumbria League)
Hawcoat Park	
Heaton Moor (promoted from North Lancashire 1) 
Leigh (relegated from North 1 West)
St Benedicts 
Tarleton  
Upper Eden 
Whitehaven 
Wigan

Participating Clubs 2013-14
Aldwinians	
Aspatria
Blackburn
Bolton (promoted from North Lancashire 1)
Eccles
Fleetwood (relegated from North 1 West)
Hawcoat Park (promoted from Cumbria League)
Keswick
Littleborough
St Benedicts
Tarleton (promoted from North Lancashire 1)
Upper Eden
Whitehaven
Workington

Participating clubs 2012−13
Aldwinians
Aspatria (relegated from North 1 West)
Blackburn
Didsbury Toc H
Eccles
Egremont
Heaton Moor
Keswick (promoted from Cumbria League)
Littleborough
St Benedicts
Upper Eden
Whitehaven (promoted from Cumbria League via Play-offs)
Wigton (relegated from North 1 West)
Workington

Original teams
When league rugby began in 1987 this division contained the following teams:

Calder Vale
Colne & Nelson
Eccles
Fleetwood
Furness
Littleborough
Moresby
Old Aldwinians
Oldham
Toc H
Vickers

North Lancashire/Cumbria Honours

North-West East/North 1 (1987–1992)

The original incarnation of North Lancashire/Cumbria was known as North-West East/North 1, and was a tier 9 league with promotion up to North West 2 and relegation down to either North-West East 1 or North-West North 1.

Cumbria/Lancs North (1992–1996)

As part of the north-west league restructuring North-West East/North 1 was renamed as Cumbria/Lancs North for the 1992–93 season with promotion continuing up to North West 2 and relegation down to either Lancashire North 1 (formerly North-West East 1) or Cumbria.  Initially a tier 9 league, the creation of National 5 North for the 1993–94 season meant that Cumbria/Lancs North dropped to become a tier 10 league.

North Lancs/Cumbria (1996–2000)

The league system was restructured from top to bottom by the Rugby Football Union for the start of the 1996–97 season.  Cumbria/Lancs North was renamed as North Lancs/Cumbria, and the cancellation of National 5 North and creation of North West 3 meant that it remained a tier 10 league.  Promotion was now to North West 3 while relegation was to either North Lancashire 1 or Cumbria.

North Lancs/Cumbria (2000–2018)

Northern league restructuring by the RFU at the end of the 1999–00 season saw the cancellation of North West 1, North West 2 and North West 3 (tiers 7-9).  This meant that North Lancs/Cumbria became a tier 7 league, with promotion to North 2 West (currently North 1 West).  Relegation continued to be to either North Lancashire 1 or Cumbria.

Promotion play-offs
Since the 2000–01 season there has been a play-off between the runners-up of North Lancashire/Cumbria and South Lancs/Cheshire 1 for the third and final promotion place to North 1 West. The team with the superior league record has home advantage in the tie.  At the end of the 2017–18 season the North Lancashire/Cumbria and South Lancs/Cheshire 1 team sides have nine wins apiece; and the home team has won promotion on thirteen occasions compared to the away teams five.

Number of league titles

Fleetwood (3)
Aldwinians (2) 
Blackburn (2)
Carlisle (2)
Oldham (2)
Rochdale (2)
St. Benedict's (2)
Wigton (2)
Workington (2)
Ashton-on-Mersey (1)
Aspatria (1)
Blackpool (1)
De La Salle (Salford) (1)
Eccles (1)
Kirkby Lonsdale (1)
Moresby (1)
Old Salians (1)
Penrith (1)
Rossendale (1)
Tyldesley (1)
Windermere (1)

See also
Cumbria RU
Lancashire RFU
English rugby union system
Rugby union in England

Notes

References

7
Rugby union in Cumbria
Rugby union in Lancashire